Debrie was a French manufacturer of cinema cameras and projectors, founded in 1900.

Joseph Jules Debrie and later his son André Debrie developed a range of cinema cameras and projectors, starting with the Parvo, which Joseph patented on 19 September 1908.

André Debrie took over control of the company from 1919.

References

Manufacturing companies of France